David Edward Williams  (born 20 August 1971), known professionally as David Walliams, is an English comedian, actor, author, writer, and television personality. He is best known for his work with Matt Lucas on the BBC sketch comedy series Little Britain (2003–2007) and Come Fly With Me (2010–2011). From 2012 to 2022, Walliams was a judge on the television talent show competition Britain's Got Talent on ITV. 
He is also a writer of children's books, having sold more than 37 million copies worldwide.

Walliams played the role of Greville White in the 2007 television drama film Capturing Mary. From 2013 to 2014, he wrote and starred in the BBC One sitcom Big School. In 2015, he starred as Tommy Beresford in the BBC drama series Partners in Crime, and wrote and starred in his own sketch comedy series Walliams & Friend. Walliams has won the award for Best TV Judge for his work on Britain's Got Talent at the 2015, 2018, 2019 and 2020 National Television Awards. In 2022, he was a judge on the tenth season of Australia's Got Talent.

Walliams began writing children's novels in 2008 after securing a contract with the publisher HarperCollins. His books have been translated into 53 languages, and he has been described as "the fastest-growing children's author in the UK", with a literary style compared to that of Roald Dahl. Some of his books have been adapted into television films, which he has also appeared in, including Mr Stink (2012), Gangsta Granny (2013) and Billionaire Boy (2016).

Walliams was appointed Officer of the Order of the British Empire (OBE) in the 2017 Birthday Honours for services to charity and the arts. His charity work includes swimming the English Channel, Strait of Gibraltar and River Thames, raising millions of pounds for the BBC charity Sport Relief.

Early life and education 
Walliams was born at St Teresa's Maternity Hospital in Wimbledon, in the London Borough of Merton, in 1971. He is the son of Peter Williams (1936–2007), a London Transport engineer, and Kathleen Williams (née Ellis), a laboratory technician who worked at Sutton Grammar School. Walliams grew up in Banstead, Surrey, specifically in the residential area of Nork, with his mother, father and sister Julie. He was educated at Collingwood Boys' School in Wallington, and Reigate Grammar School in Surrey, where he was a contemporary of writer Robert Shearman. From 1989 to 1992, he studied at the University of Bristol, where he resided at Manor Hall and graduated with Bachelor of Arts (Drama). During university holidays in 1990, Walliams performed with the National Youth Theatre, where he met future comedy partner and friend Matt Lucas. He changed his stage name to David Walliams when he joined college Equity, as there was already a member named David Williams.

Television career
Walliams performed in the Big Finish Productions Doctor Who audio play Phantasmagoria, written by Mark Gatiss in 1999. In 2005, Walliams, Simon Pegg, Lucy Davis and Lauren Laverne starred in the video for Charlotte Hatherley's single "Bastardo". Later in the year, Walliams presented a documentary on James Bond, entitled David Walliams: My Life with James Bond. In 2007, he returned to non-comedy television, garnering positive reviews for his portrayal of a suave and dangerous manipulator in Stephen Poliakoff's Capturing Mary.

He portrayed comedian Frankie Howerd in the BBC Four television film Rather You Than Me. In 2010, Walliams appeared with Paul Rudd and Steve Carell in the comedy Dinner for Schmucks. Walliams played the strange mole-like alien Gibbis in the sixth series of Doctor Who, in the episode "The God Complex", broadcast on BBC One in 2011. In April 2012 Walliams appeared in an episode of ITV's Perspectives programme entitled "David Walliams: The Genius of Dahl". Also in 2012, he narrated Are You Having a Laugh? TV and Disability on BBC Two, and the ITV2 series Top Dog Model.

In 2013, Walliams appeared in two episodes of the comedy series Blandings as Rupert Baxter, an efficiency expert hired to serve as Lord Emsworth's secretary. Also that year, and in 2014, Walliams starred as chemistry teacher Keith Church in the BBC One sitcom Big School, which he created and co-wrote. The series also starred Catherine Tate, Frances de la Tour and Philip Glenister. In March 2014 Walliams narrated a short video for the charity, Electrical Safety First, featuring the character Charley from the Charley Says educational films of the 1970s.

For Comic Relief 2015, Walliams appeared as Lou Todd and Stephen Hawking in the Andy Pipkin role along with Catherine Tate as a nun. In 2015, coinciding with the 125th anniversary of Agatha Christie's birth, Walliams played the role of Tommy Beresford in Partners in Crime, a six-part BBC series. In September 2015, Walliams began filming for his BBC sketch show Walliams & Friend, which also starred Joanna Lumley and Morgana Robinson and premiered on Christmas Eve in 2015. The show returned for a full series in November 2016.

Walliams hosted the final comedy show Thrills and Spills in December 2016. The final was held in Louisville, Kentucky. In December 2016, Walliams presented the Royal Variety Performance and a Christmas special episode of Blankety Blank, both shows for ITV. In 2017, Walliams guest presented five episodes of The Nightly Show for ITV.

In 2017, Walliams, along with Rochelle Humes, were both confirmed as Voice Trumpets, joining the existing cast of Daniel Rigby, Antonia Thomas, Jim Broadbent, Fearne Cotton and Jane Horrocks In series 2 of the reboot of classic British children's television series Teletubbies.

In October 2019, Walliams became the new National Television Awards (NTAs) host for 2020, taking over after Dermot O'Leary's ten year presenting stint.

Matt Lucas
Walliams and Matt Lucas first met at the National Youth Theatre. At their first meeting, Lucas did an impression of Jimmy Savile and Walliams an impression of Frankie Howerd. They would not meet again for another year. In the late 1990s, playing minor roles in sketches such as The Club, Walliams and Lucas played grotesque caricatures of various rock musicians in the series Rock Profile and in the spoof documentary series Sir Bernard's Stately Homes. They were also stars of the Paramount Comedy Channel show Mash and Peas, and it was in this guise that they appeared in the Fat Les video. Walliams and Lucas also had small roles in Plunkett and Maclaine as prisoners.

The duo appeared together in a music video for the Pet Shop Boys single "I'm with Stupid", in which the two are apparently auditioning their version of the song's video for Neil Tennant and Chris Lowe, who are tied up and appear to be hostages.

The pair are best known for Little Britain, which ran from 2003 to 2009 on the BBC in the UK and from 2008 onwards on HBO in the USA. The programme first aired on BBC Three before moving to the more mainstream BBC One. Among the characters Walliams played were Emily Howard, a deluded "transvestite"; Ray McCooney, an insane Scottish hotel owner; and Sebastian Love, an aide de camp to the Prime Minister (portrayed by Anthony Head) on whom Love has a huge crush. A successful live stage show of the series, Little Britain Live, was produced in 2006. A number of seasonal and charity specials followed, up to 2009. A spin-off series produced in the United States by HBO, Little Britain USA, aired in 2008. The characters from Little Britain played by Walliams and Lucas appeared in a 2010 UK television advertising campaign for the Nationwide Building Society. In January 2005 Walliams and Lucas were named the most powerful people in TV comedy by Radio Times.

Their later series was Come Fly with Me, a six-part series airing on BBC One. The first episode was the third most-watched programme of Christmas Day 2010, and the most watched comedy of the year. The duo have not worked or made any public appearances together since early 2011 (although they each make separate cameo appearances in Michael Winterbottom's 2013 film The Look of Love).

Little Britain returned to BBC Radio 4 on 31 October 2019, for a one-off special entitled Little Brexit.

Britain's Got Talent
From 2012 to 2022, Walliams was a judge on the ITV1 talent show Britain's Got Talent with Amanda Holden, Alesha Dixon and Simon Cowell. In 2015, 2018 and 2019, he was recognised at the National Television Awards as Best Judge for his involvement in the series. 

In November 2022, after controversy erupted regarding leaked disparaging comments made by Walliams to contestants, it was reported that Walliams had decided "to bow out after a ten-year run", and that he wished to leave the show "on a high after a wonderful time".

Writing career

Children's novels 
In early 2008 Walliams signed a contract with HarperCollins to publish two children's books. The debut novel, The Boy in the Dress, illustrated by Quentin Blake, was released worldwide on 1 November 2008. It explores several of the themes of Little Britain from Walliams' own life on an emotional level, such as the camp humour of cross-dressing and effeminacy. The story recounts a neglected 12-year-old boy called Dennis' search for a female role model, his friendship with the popular girl in school, and the ways in which relationships develop along gender lines. The story has a strong resonance with Anne Fine's 1989 book Bill's New Frock. This book was adapted into a film for Christmas 2014.

In November 2009 came Mr Stink, again illustrated by Quentin Blake, about a 12-year-old girl who meets a tramp and helps look after him. She keeps him hidden from her family. The book consists of 26 illustrated chapters full of jokes. It is aimed at teenagers and children over 9. It was the last of Walliams books to be illustrated by Quentin Blake. The book was awarded the Children's Award in the inaugural People's Book Prize in 2010, and was made into a 60-minute film, which premiered on BBC One on 23 December 2012.

On 28 October 2010 Walliams published his third book Billionaire Boy, illustrated by Tony Ross, telling the story of Joe Spud, the richest 12-year-old in the country. Joe's father is a famous inventor, and his wealth means that Joe has everything he could ever want: his own bowling alley, cinema and a trained orangutan who serves as his butler, but there is just one thing he really needs: a friend. The book included a 'billion pound note' that was used to enter a competition to win a day as a billionaire in London. This was the first of his books to be illustrated by Tony Ross.

Walliams' fourth book, Gangsta Granny was released in October 2011 and again illustrated by Tony Ross. It tells the story of Ben who is bored every time he is made to stay at his grandma's house as all she wants to do is to play board games and eat cabbage soup. Ben learns that she was once an international jewel thief and all her life she has wanted to steal the crown jewels. Ben is determined that they do it together. It won a Red House Children's Book Award and was adapted to be a 70-minute film for BBC One and shown on 26 December 2013.

In September 2012 Walliams released his fifth children's book, Ratburger, telling the story of a young girl named Zoe whose life is a misery as she has an evil stepmother. It was made into a one-off drama for Sky One.

Ratburger was followed in September 2013 by Walliams' sixth book, Demon Dentist, relating the tale of a young boy named Alfie with no family except his dad whose world goes upside-down when a new dentist arrives in town. The book won the top prize in the Younger Readers category at the 2015 Red House Children's Book Awards.

Walliams' seventh children's book, Awful Auntie, was released on 25 September 2014. This was the story of a girl named Stella whose Auntie has moved into her house with her owl, Wagner. It is the first (and currently only) of Walliams' books to not include Raj the newsagent, due to the book being set in the 1930s before Raj was born.

In September 2015 he released Grandpa's Great Escape. The story follows a boy called Jack trying to rescue his Grandpa who suffers from Alzheimer's disease from a care home run by an evil matron. The book was adapted for BBC One, with the script written by Walliams and Kevin Cecil, and starring Tom Courtenay as Grandpa. This book, although set in the 1980s like Awful Auntie is, sees the return of Raj the newsagent. The same year that Grandpa's Great Escape was published, Walliams backed children's fairytales app GivingTales in aid of UNICEF, together with Roger Moore, Stephen Fry, Ewan McGregor, Joan Collins, Joanna Lumley, Michael Caine, Charlotte Rampling and Paul McKenna.

The Midnight Gang was published in November 2016. Bad Dad was published in November 2017. Walliams sold £16.57 million worth of books in 2017. The Ice Monster was published in November 2018. Walliams' latest children's novel, Spaceboy, was published in September 2022.

Picture books

Short story collections 

Illustrated in colour by Tony Ross, Walliams' three The World's Worst Children short story collections, centered around 'five beastly boys and five gruesome girls', were published in May 2016, May 2017 and May 2018, respectively.

The World's Worst Teachers was published on 27 June.

In September 2021 it was announced that one of the stories in The World's Worst Children would be removed after podcaster Georgie Ma made a complaint, saying Walliams' book was "normalising jokes on minorities from a young age." The story criticised by Ma earlier in the year is "about a Chinese boy called Brian Wong" who is "never, ever wrong". Ma, who also called out the story for its "casual racism", talked in May with representatives of HarperCollins, who agreed to remove the story in future editions of the book.

Other work

Theatre 
On 26 August 2008 Walliams made his stage debut at the Gate Theatre in Dublin opposite Michael Gambon in Harold Pinter's No Man's Land, in front of an audience that included Pinter himself. The production transferred to London later in the year.

In 2013, he played the part of Bottom in a production of A Midsummer Night's Dream at the Noël Coward Theatre opposite Sheridan Smith as Titania.

In July 2014, Walliams appeared on stage with Monty Python during their live show Monty Python Live (Mostly) held at the O2 Arena, London. He was the special guest in their "Blackmail" sketch.

Screenwriting
In addition to his writing credits for his sketch shows and adaptions of his novels, he co-wrote an animated film titled Shadows with filmmaker Edgar Wright for DreamWorks Animation. It was released in 2019.

In 2018, Walliams also starred in the British Airways Safety video, which was conducted in conjunction with Comic Relief for the airlines in house charity. Walliams most notable occasion in the video is the lifejacket instruction. Since then the video has been reworked with a mixture of the previous version; however, Walliams still appears in the new version.

Charity work

Telethon hosting 
Walliams co-hosted a segment of the Sport Relief telethon in 2012, co-hosting the 22:00–22:40 slot with Miranda Hart when the show moved over to BBC Two while the BBC News at Ten was aired.

Walliams also co-hosted the 2014 Sport Relief telethon. This time, he hosted the earlier slot between 19:00–22:00 with Gary Lineker and later Davina McCall.

Swimming the English Channel 
On 4 July 2006 Walliams swam the English Channel for Sport Relief. It took him 10 hours and 34 minutes to swim the 22-mile (35 km) stretch of sea, equivalent to 700 lengths of an Olympic-size swimming pool. This was wrongly reported as one of the top 50 recorded times for an unaided Channel crossing; in reality Walliams placed 167th at the time of crossing in only the CSA listings, excluding the CSPF listings. He raised over £1 million in donations. Under the supervision of his trainer, he trained for nine months to prepare for the swim. The training had to coincide with Walliams and Lucas's Little Britain Live tour, so he daily had to train for several hours before performing on stage in the evening.

Walliams first swam from Lee-on-the-Solent near Portsmouth to the Isle of Wight in around two hours and also completed an eight-hour swim off the coast of Croatia before embarking on the cross-Channel attempt. Walliams has insisted that prior to his challenge he had never seriously taken part in any sport. The Bluetones' lead singer Mark Morriss wrote a song, "Fade In/Fade Out", in honour of Walliams' achievement; it can be found on their self-titled album, released on 9 October 2006.

Swimming the Strait of Gibraltar 
On 7 March 2008 Walliams, along with James Cracknell, swam the  Strait of Gibraltar from Spain to Morocco, again for Sport Relief. He successfully completed the swim in just over 4½ hours.

Cycling 
In March 2010 Walliams and a group of celebrities cycled an end-to-end journey through the UK, raising over £1 million for Sport Relief. Walliams suffered a serious fall when tackling the Kirkstone Pass, a thousand-foot climb in the Lake District but was able to complete the ride.

24 Hour Panel People 
In March 2011 Walliams undertook 24 Hour Panel People, in which he took part in back-to-back recordings of various panel show formats over the course of 24 hours to raise money for Comic Relief. The recordings were streamed live on the BBC website. He took part in 19 episodes of "classic" TV panel shows.

Swimming the Thames 

From 5 to 12 September 2011 Walliams swam the length of the River Thames and raised more than £2 million for Sport Relief. Once he had got out of the river Walliams said "I think a bath is the only water I will be seeing for a while." The swim resulted in him getting giardiasis and injuring an intervertebral disc. In late 2013, Walliams had emergency back surgery to alleviate issues caused by the swim.

Personal life
In 2007, Walliams' father, Peter, died of an aggressive form of liver cancer.

In 2009, Walliams dated eighteen-year-old model Lauren Budd. Budd claimed Walliams had approached her agent, Premier Model Management for a date with Budd.

In 2009, Walliams began dating Dutch model Lara Stone. On 20 January 2010, they got engaged after her parents had given their blessing to the relationship. On 16 May 2010, the couple were married at central London's Claridge's Hotel. On 6 May 2013, Stone gave birth to the couple's child, Alfred.

Walliams and Stone lived in the house with recording studio, formerly owned by Noel Gallagher, known as Supernova Heights in Belsize Park, north London. It was reported on 4 March 2015 that, following five years of marriage, the pair had decided to try a trial separation after "drifting apart". On 9 September 2015, Walliams filed for divorce from Stone, citing "unreasonable behaviour". The couple were granted a decree nisi the next day; the marriage was formally dissolved six weeks after the date of filing.

Walliams hinted at being pansexual in the book Inside Little Britain, but said he did not like to be labelled by that word. In an interview with Radio Times in 2013, he stated: "I think it's all about falling in love with the person and that is overlooked, really. I hate it when people 'confess' or 'reveal' their sexuality and also things can change for people over the years. So it is about the person but I also think it goes beyond that. You don't just fall in love with someone's body, do you? You fall in love with someone's soul and heart and brain."

Walliams has been diagnosed with bipolar disorder, and he described his 2006 swim of the English Channel as "some sort of redemption".

Controversies

Exposing teenagers' genitals and simulating sex during 'Hide the Sausage' 
Walliams performed a 'Hide the Sausage' sketch numerous times during the Little Britain Live tour in 2006 and subsequent worldwide tours including Little Britain in Australia in 2007 and at charity events.  Walliams portrayed a fictional, gay, former children's entertainer and sex offender named Des Kaye who invites volunteers from the audience or celebrity guests to play the game. Recordings of the sketch include footage where Walliams attempts to kiss participants, manhandles them, pulls their trousers and underwear down, and simulates anal sex. Volunteers are seen "grappling to keep their genitals covered." The sketch was criticised by gay rights campaigners and attracted criticism and concern from members of the public.

Teenagers during Little Britain Down Under 
Footage from a 2007 BBC documentary titled Little Britain Down Under shows Walliams inviting male teenagers, said to be aged sixteen to eighteen, to play 'Hide the Sausage' on stage. Walliams asks the volunteers to confirm their ages and says "Bingo" when one claims they are sixteen years old before adding, "You're a big boy for 16 aren't you - that's what I'll tell the judge." 

Walliams is seen pulling down the trousers and underwear of young men before he appears to kiss their buttocks and simulate anal sex. The volunteers attempt to keep their clothes on. 

During the documentary, Walliams reads a letter he claims was written by a victim of sexual abuse who criticises the Des Kaye character. Elsewhere in the documentary, Walliams says, "I love cruelty, it's my favourite thing in the world."

Exposing Jeremy Edward's genitals and Mark Ronson's buttocks 
In 2006, Walliams performed 'Hide the Sausage' during the Little Britain Comic Relief Gala at the Hammersmith Apollo. Participants included comedian David Baddiel and English actor Jeremy Edwards whose genitals were exposed to more than 3,000 people in the live audience. Walliams also 'dry humped' Edwards and laid on top of him. Walliams said on stage, "That was not meant to happen. You were not supposed to see gonad. Arse crack, yes. Gonad, no.' An image of the incident, that includes Edwards' penis, is available to purchase on Getty Images

Chortle reported that. "tellingly, Edwardswho seemed genuinely embarrassed by the incidentdid not appear at the final curtain call."

On 2 November 2009, Walliams performed the sketch with Mark Ronson at London's O2 Academy Brixton in front of 3,000 people at a charity event for Concert for CARE. Footage from the event shows Ronson trying to stop Walliams from pulling his trousers and underwear down. Ronson's buttocks were exposed. After the event, Walliams was reported to have said, "When I put my mind to it, I have the strength of ten men so there's no stopping me. Mark is a cool, calm character. To put him in that position was out of his comfort zone." Walliams claimed that he offered to buy Ronson a new suit.

Criticism and violent reaction from theatre goers 
Matt Lucas discussed the 'Hide the Sausage' sketch in his 2017 autobiography titled Little Me and claimed that some audience members reacted with violence. Lucas wrote that. "During a game of 'Hide the Sausage', he would almost always wrestle the trousers off some poor lad" adding that, "You could never get away with that today. In fact he didn't always get away with it then. Sometimes David would get a clout for his troubles and I'd see him in the wings afterwards, nursing a sore ear."
Critics of the sketch included human rights campaigner Peter Tatchell who said it, "crosses a red line into the sexual humiliation of young men. Tatchell added:Williams portrayal of a predatory paedophile is not funny. It's sickening and unacceptable. That sketch should not be repeated anywhere. It should be withdrawn from public viewing and filed in a film archive so that future historians have evidence of what passed for 'comedy' only 13 years ago. Some viewers will have interpreted Walliams as playing the trope of gay men as predators and paedophiles. Even though Walliams supports the LGBT+ community, his depiction plays into the hands of those who wrongly equate homosexuality with the exploitation of young people.

Kim Jong-un Halloween costume 
In early November 2017, Walliams caused upset through his dressing as North Korean leader Kim Jong-un for Halloween and posting it online. He had shared the photograph on his Twitter account, in costume, wearing a black suit, wig, and artificial prosthetics that appeared to alter his eyelids and hairline. There was an immediate backlash online, many Twitter users branding the outfit "racist" and accusing Walliams of "yellow-face". Others made the point that it was insensitive for Walliams to dress as Kim Jong-un given the North Korean leader's 'appalling' human rights record. Walliams responded to the backlash lightly, constructing a fake text message from Kim Jong-un which he posted to Twitter, reading: "Hi Dave, Loved the Halloween outfit mate! Wet meself laughing. Don't see what all the fuss is about. Kim x. PS Can't wait to read Bad Dad."

Presidents Club Charitable Trust 

In January 2018, Walliams attended a Presidents Club Charitable Trust charity auction as a host, as well as offering the opportunity to name a character in a future book as an auction prize. The 2018 event was his third time hosting, with Walliams additionally offering that he would be "personally presenting the book to your family over afternoon tea". This event was later subject to significant controversy, after undercover reporters reported many of the hostesses were subject to groping and sexual harassment from the all-male attendees. Walliams said he attended the event in a "strictly professional capacity" as host, and "left immediately" after his set ended, stating that he was "absolutely appalled" by the reports. The controversy caused some bookshops to remove his books from sale, with the owner of Chicken and Frog noting "even if he was unaware, when the highly inappropriate suggested names were mentioned for his auction lot, or the plastic surgery to ‘add spice to your wife’, he should have walked away. He did not".

Stereotypes and black face 
In June 2020, Netflix, Britbox, NOW TV and BBC iPlayer dropped Walliams and Lucas' Little Britain and Come Fly With Me, over the use of blackface and stereotypes to portray black, disabled, working class, transgender, and gay people. In Little Britain, both Walliams and Lucas use make up to portray different races, with Walliams portraying a black health-spa guest called Desiree Devere. Variety Magazine attributed the widespread removal of the series on streaming platforms to heightened awareness in the wake of George Floyd's murder and the resulting Black Lives Matter protests. After the removal, Walliams and Lucas released identical apologies on their Twitter: "[We] have both spoken publicly in recent years of our regret that we played characters of other races. Once again we want to make it clear that it was wrong & we are very sorry.”

Children's books 
In July 2020, tweets by author and activist Jack Monroe described Walliams' books as "like Little Britain for kids", with "horrific racism and classism and bodyshaming in a veneer of privileged deniability". HarperCollins issued a response, stating "David Walliams's books have a diverse readership which is reflected in their content".

Britain's Got Talent remarks 
In November 2022, it emerged that Walliams had made sexually explicit and derogatory remarks towards some of the contestants on Britain's Got Talent, during a recording at the London Palladium in January 2020. He was recorded as saying of one of them, "She thinks you want to fuck her, but you don’t... I know, she’s just like: ‘Oh, fuck off!’ I was saying, she thinks you want to fuck her, but you don't. It's the last thing on your mind, but she's like: ‘Yep, I bet you do!’ ‘No I don’t!’ I had a bit of a boner, but now it's going, it's now shrivelled up inside my body." In a statement later, he said: "I would like to apologise to the people I made disrespectful comments about during breaks in filming for Britain's Got Talent in 2020. These were private conversations and – like most conversations with friends – were never intended to be shared. Nevertheless, I am sorry."

Filmography

Television

Film

Awards and honours
Walliams was given a special award in recognition of his sporting efforts for charity. Matt Lucas produced a documentary on the subject, entitled Little Britain's Big Swim. On 6 November 2006, Walliams won the Pride of Britain Award for "The Most Influential Public Figure" as he raised more than £1.5 million swimming the channel for the Sport Relief charity. Although initially tipped as a contender for the BBC's Sports Personality of the Year poll for 2006, Walliams failed to make the final shortlist of 10 contenders. Walliams was given a special award during the ceremony for his achievement. In July 2006, he became Patron of 'Cardiac Risk in the Young'.

At the 2012 National Television Awards, Walliams won the 'Landmark Achievement Award', for his television career and achievements for Sport Relief. In December 2012 he won the Specsavers National Book Awards "Children's Book of the Year" for Ratburger. In December 2013 he won the Specsavers National Book Awards "Children's Book of the Year" for Demon Dentist. In December 2014 he won the Specsavers National Book Awards "Children's Book of the Year" for Awful Auntie. Awful Auntie also won the 2014 Specsavers National Book Awards "Audiobook of the Year".

Walliams has won the award for Best TV Judge at the 2015, 2018 and 2019 National Television Awards.

He was appointed Officer of the Order of the British Empire (OBE) in the 2017 Birthday Honours for services to charity and the arts. He was invested with the honour by Princess Anne.

Bibliography

Non-fiction
 Inside Little Britain (with Boyd Hilton and Matt Lucas): London: Ebury Press: 2006: 
Autobiography
 Camp David (2012)

Children's fiction

Novels 
The first two novels are illustrated by Quentin Blake and the last novel is illustrated by Adam Stower, the rest are illustrated by Tony Ross.
 The Boy in the Dress (2008)
 Mr Stink (2009)
 Billionaire Boy (2010)
 Gangsta Granny (2011)
 Ratburger (2012)
 Demon Dentist (2013)
 Awful Auntie (2014)
 Grandpa's Great Escape (2015)
 The Midnight Gang (2016)
 Bad Dad (2017)
 The Ice Monster (2018)
 Fing (2019)
 The Beast of Buckingham Palace (2019)
 Slime (2020)
 Code Name Bananas (2020)
 Megamonster (2021)
 Gangsta Granny Strikes Again! (2021)
 Spaceboy (2022)

Short story collections 
Illustrated by Tony Ross.
 The World's Worst Children (2016)
 The World's Worst Children 2 (2017)
 The World's Worst Children 3 (2018)
 The World's Worst Teachers (2019)
 The World's Worst Parents (2020)
 The World's Worst Pets (2022)

Picture books 
 The Slightly Annoying Elephant (2013)
 The First Hippo on the Moon (2014)
 The Queen's Orang-utan (2015, for Comic Relief)
 The Bear Who Went Boo! (2015)
 There's a Snake in My School! (2016)
 Boogie Bear (2018)
 Geronimo (2018)

World Book Day book 
 Blob (2017)

References

External links
 
 

 
1971 births
Living people
20th-century English comedians
21st-century English comedians
20th-century English male actors
21st-century English male actors
21st-century English novelists
Alumni of the University of Bristol
English autobiographers
English children's writers
English Channel swimmers
English male comedians
English comedy writers
English male film actors
English radio writers
English male soap opera actors
English male stage actors
English television personalities
English television producers
English television writers
English male voice actors
Labour Party (UK) people
Little Britain
Male long-distance swimmers
People educated at Reigate Grammar School
People with bipolar disorder
National Youth Theatre members
People from Banstead
British sketch comedians
Best Comedy Performance BAFTA Award (television) winners
Officers of the Order of the British Empire
British male comedy actors
British male television writers
21st-century British screenwriters